IDSM may refer to:

 The Indian Distinguished Service Medal
 The Hong Kong Immigration Service Medal for Distinguished Service